Ganj may refer to:

Shah Jo Risalo, a poetry book written by Shah Abdul Latif Bhittai of Sindh
Cannabis (drug)
Ganj, Afghanistan
Ganj, Chaharmahal and Bakhtiari, Iran
Ganj, Hormozgan, Iran
Ganj-e Besiar, Kohgiluyeh and Boyer-Ahmad Province, Iran

Place name suffix
 Ganj: originally meaning "treasure" in Middle Persian and Modern Persian, now a common suffix/prefix meaning "treasured place" or "neighbourhood" in Hindi, Bengali and Urdu, used in names of bazaar, mandi, store, market place and towns in India, Bangladesh and Nepal. Some examples of place names which include the -ganj suffix are:
 Babuganj, Barisal, Bangladesh
 Badarganj, Rangpur, Bangladesh
 Bakerganj, Barisal, Bangladesh
 Baksiganj, Jamalpur, Bangladesh
 Birganj, Dinajpur, Bangladesh
 Bochaganj, Dinajpur, Bangladesh
 Daryaganj, India
 Debiganj, Panchagarh, Bangladesh
 Dewanganj, Jamalpur, Bangladesh
 Forbesganj, India
 Gauriganj, India
 Ghale ganj, Iran
 Gobindaganj, Gaibandha, Bangladesh
 Gopalganj, Bihar, India
 Habibganj, India
 Habiganj, Bangladesh
 Ishwarganj, Mymensingh, Bangladesh
 Kaliganj, Lalmonirhat, Bangladesh
 Kishanganj, India
 Kishoreganj, Nilphamari, Bangladesh
 Madarganj, Jamalpur, Bangladesh
 McLeod Ganj, India
 Mehendiganj, Barisal, Bangladesh
 Mirzaganj, Patuakhali, Bangladesh
 Mohanganj, Netrokona, Bangladesh
 Narayanganj, Bangladesh
 Nawabganj, Bangladesh
 Nawabganj, Dinajpur, Bangladesh
 Nepalganj, Nepal
 Paharganj (Shahganj during Mughal era), India
 Pirganj, Rangpur, Bangladesh
 Pirganj, Thakurgaon, Bangladesh
 Raiganj, Sirajganj, Bangladesh
 Robertsganj, India
 Sayestaganj, Habiganj, Bangladesh
 Shibganj, Bogra, Bangladesh
 Shibganj, Nawabganj, Bangladesh
 Sirajganj, Bangladesh
 Sultanganj, India
 Sunamganj, Bangladesh
 Sundarganj, Gaibandha, Bangladesh
 Taraganj, Rangpur, Bangladesh
 Thakurganj, India

See also
 -stan
 -land
 -pur
 -desh
 -patnam
 -abad

Bengali words and phrases